Peter Kowitz is an Australian actor.

Film and television acting 
His television credits include: Prime Time, Richmond Hill, Rafferty's Rules, Chances, Pacific Drive, Water Rats, Big Sky, Halifax f.p., Swimming With Sharks, Wildside, Farscape, Murder Call, Grass Roots, All Saints, Supernova, and Janet King. His film credits include Spook.

Theatre 
Peter Kowitz is one of Australia's most prolific stage performers and has worked extensively in comedy. He has had roles in classics like Summer of the Seventeenth Doll, Who's Afraid of Virginia Woolf? and A Doll's House, as well as numerous Shakespearean plays.

Awards 
He has won two AFI awards – in 1986, when he was named Best Lead Actor in a Telefeature for The Long Way Home, and in 1989, when he was awarded Best Performance by an Actor in a mini-series for Body Surfer.

External links
 

Year of birth missing (living people)
Living people
AACTA Award winners
Australian male television actors